Sylvia Plath (October 27, 1932 – February 11, 1963) was an American poet, novelist, and short story writer. She is credited with advancing the genre of confessional poetry and is best known for two of her published collections, The Colossus and Other Poems (1960) and Ariel (1965), as well as The Bell Jar, a semi-autobiographical novel published shortly before her suicide in 1963. The Collected Poems was published in 1981, which included previously unpublished works. For this collection Plath was awarded a Pulitzer Prize in Poetry in 1982, making her the fourth to receive this honour posthumously.

Born in Boston, Massachusetts, Plath graduated from Smith College in Massachusetts and the University of Cambridge, England, where she was a student at Newnham College. She married fellow poet Ted Hughes in 1956, and they lived together in the United States and then in England. Their relationship was tumultuous and, in her letters, Plath alleges abuse at his hands. They had two children before separating in 1962.

Plath was clinically depressed for most of her adult life, and was treated multiple times with electroconvulsive therapy (ECT). She killed herself in 1963.

Life and career

Early life
Sylvia Plath was born on October 27, 1932, in Boston, Massachusetts. Her mother, Aurelia Schober Plath (1906–1994), was a second-generation American of Austrian descent, and her father, Otto Plath (1885–1940), was from Grabow, Mecklenburg-Schwerin, Germany. Plath's father was an entomologist and a professor of biology at Boston University who authored a book about bumblebees.

On April 27, 1935, Plath's brother Warren was born. In 1936 the family moved from 24 Prince Street in Jamaica Plain, Massachusetts, to 92 Johnson Avenue, Winthrop, Massachusetts. Plath's mother, Aurelia, with Plath's maternal grandparents, the Schobers, had lived since 1920 in a section of Winthrop called Point Shirley, a location mentioned in Plath's poetry. While living in Winthrop, eight-year-old Plath published her first poem in the Boston Heralds children's section. Over the next few years, Plath published multiple poems in regional magazines and newspapers. At age 11, Plath began keeping a journal. In addition to writing, she showed early promise as an artist, winning an award for her paintings from the Scholastic Art & Writing Awards in 1947. "Even in her youth, Plath was ambitiously driven to succeed." Plath also had an IQ of around 160.

Otto Plath died on November 5, 1940, a week and a half after Plath's eighth birthday, of complications following the amputation of a foot due to untreated diabetes. He had become ill shortly after a close friend died of lung cancer. Comparing the similarities between his friend's symptoms and his own, Otto became convinced that he, too, had lung cancer and did not seek treatment until his diabetes had progressed too far. Raised as a Unitarian, Plath experienced a loss of faith after her father's death and remained ambivalent about religion throughout her life. Her father was buried in Winthrop Cemetery, in Massachusetts. A visit to her father's grave later prompted Plath to write the poem "Electra on Azalea Path". After Otto's death, Aurelia moved her children and her parents to 26 Elmwood Road, Wellesley, Massachusetts, in 1942. Plath commented in "Ocean 1212-W", one of her final works, that her first nine years "sealed themselves off like a ship in a bottle—beautiful, inaccessible, obsolete, a fine, white flying myth". Plath attended Bradford Senior High School (now Wellesley High School) in Wellesley, graduating in 1950. Just after graduating from high school, she had her first national publication in the Christian Science Monitor.

College years and depression

In 1950, Plath attended Smith College, a private women's liberal arts college in Massachusetts. She excelled academically. While at Smith, she lived in Lawrence House, and a plaque can be found outside her old room. She edited The Smith Review. After her third year of college, Plath was awarded a coveted position as a guest editor at Mademoiselle magazine, during which she spent a month in New York City. The experience was not what she had hoped for, and many of the events that took place during that summer were later used as inspiration for her novel The Bell Jar.

She was furious at not being at a meeting the editor had arranged with Welsh poet Dylan Thomas—a writer whom she loved, said one of her boyfriends, "more than life itself". She hung around the White Horse Tavern and the Chelsea Hotel for two days, hoping to meet Thomas, but he was already on his way home. A few weeks later, she slashed her legs to see if she had enough "courage" to kill herself. During this time she was not accepted into a Harvard writing seminar with author Frank O’Connor. Following electroconvulsive therapy for depression, Plath made her first medically documented suicide attempt on August 24, 1953, by crawling under the front porch and taking her mother's sleeping pills.

She survived this first suicide attempt, later writing that she "blissfully succumbed to the whirling blackness that I honestly believed was eternal oblivion". She spent the next six months in psychiatric care, receiving more electric and insulin shock treatment under the care of Ruth Beuscher. Her stay at McLean Hospital and her Smith Scholarship were paid for by Olive Higgins Prouty, who had successfully recovered from a mental breakdown herself. Plath seemed to make a good recovery and returned to college.

In January 1955, she submitted her thesis, The Magic Mirror: A Study of the Double in Two of Dostoyevsky's Novels, and in June graduated from Smith with an A.B., summa cum laude. She was a member of the Phi Beta Kappa academic honor society.

She obtained a Fulbright Scholarship to study at Newnham College, one of the two women-only colleges of the University of Cambridge in England, where she continued actively writing poetry and publishing her work in the student newspaper Varsity. At Newnham, she studied with Dorothea Krook, whom she held in high regard. She spent her first year winter and spring holidays traveling around Europe.

Career and marriage

Plath met poet Ted Hughes on February 25, 1956. In a 1961 BBC interview (now held by the British Library Sound Archive), Plath describes how she met Hughes:
I'd read some of Ted's poems in this magazine and I was very impressed and I wanted to meet him. I went to this little celebration and that's actually where we met... Then we saw a great deal of each other. Ted came back to Cambridge and suddenly we found ourselves getting married a few months later... We kept writing poems to each other. Then it just grew out of that, I guess, a feeling that we both were writing so much and having such a fine time doing it, we decided that this should keep on. Plath described Hughes as "a singer, story-teller, lion and world-wanderer" with "a voice like the thunder of God".

The couple married on June 16, 1956, at St George the Martyr, Holborn in London (now in the Borough of Camden) with Plath's mother in attendance, and spent their honeymoon in Paris and Benidorm. Plath returned to Newnham in October to begin her second year. During this time, they both became deeply interested in astrology and the supernatural, using ouija boards.

In June 1957, Plath and Hughes moved to the United States, and from September, Plath taught at Smith College, her alma mater. She found it difficult to both teach and have enough time and energy to write, and in the middle of 1958, the couple moved to Boston. Plath took a job as a receptionist in the psychiatric unit of Massachusetts General Hospital and, in the evening sat in on creative writing seminars given by poet Robert Lowell (also attended by the writers Anne Sexton and George Starbuck).

Both Lowell and Sexton encouraged Plath to write from her experience and she did so. She openly discussed her depression with Lowell and her suicide attempts with Sexton, who led her to write from a more female perspective. Plath began to consider herself as a more serious, focused poet and short story writer. At this time Plath and Hughes first met the poet W. S. Merwin, who admired their work and was to remain a lifelong friend. Plath resumed psychoanalytic treatment in December, working with Ruth Beuscher.

Plath and Hughes traveled across Canada and the United States, staying at the Yaddo artist colony in Saratoga Springs, New York in late 1959. Plath says that it was here that she learned "to be true to my own weirdnesses", but she remained anxious about writing confessionally, from deeply personal and private material. The couple moved back to England in December 1959 and lived in London at 3 Chalcot Square, near the Primrose Hill area of Regent's Park, where an English Heritage plaque records Plath's residence. Their daughter Frieda was born on April 1, 1960, and in October, Plath published her first collection of poetry, The Colossus.

In February 1961, Plath's second pregnancy ended in miscarriage; several of her poems, including "Parliament Hill Fields", address this event. In a letter to her therapist, Plath wrote that Hughes beat her two days before the miscarriage. In August she finished her semi-autobiographical novel The Bell Jar and immediately after this, the family moved to Court Green in the small market town of North Tawton in Devon. Nicholas was born in January 1962. In mid-1962, Plath and Hughes began to keep bees, which would be the subject of many Plath poems.

In August 1961, the couple rented their flat at Chalcot Square to Assia Wevill (née Gutmann) and David Wevill. Hughes was immediately struck with the beautiful Assia, as she was with him. In June 1962, Plath had a car accident which she described as one of many suicide attempts. In July 1962, Plath discovered Hughes had been having an affair with Assia Wevill; in September, Plath and Hughes separated.

Beginning in October 1962, Plath experienced a great burst of creativity and wrote most of the poems on which her reputation now rests, writing at least 26 of the poems of her posthumous collection Ariel during the final months of her life. In December 1962, she returned alone to London with their children, and rented, on a five-year lease, a flat at 23 Fitzroy Road—only a few streets from the Chalcot Square flat. William Butler Yeats once lived in the house, which bears an English Heritage blue plaque for the Irish poet. Plath was pleased by this fact and considered it a good omen.

The northern winter of 1962–1963 was one of the coldest in 100 years; the pipes froze, the children—now two years old and nine months—were often sick, and the house had no telephone. Her depression returned but she completed the rest of her poetry collection, which would be published after her death (1965 in the UK, 1966 in the US). Her only novel, The Bell Jar, was published in January 1963, under the pen name Victoria Lucas, and was met with critical indifference.

Final depressive episode and death
Before her death, Plath tried several times to take her own life. On August 24, 1953, she overdosed on sleeping pills, then, in June1962, she drove her car off the side of the road into a river, which she later said was an attempt to take her own life.

In January1963, Plath spoke with John Horder, her general practitioner, and a close friend who lived near her. She described the current depressive episode she was experiencing; it had been ongoing for six or seven months. While for most of the time she had been able to continue working, her depression had worsened and become severe, "marked by constant agitation, suicidal thoughts and inability to cope with daily life". Plath struggled with insomnia, taking medication at night to induce sleep, and frequently woke up early. She lost 20pounds (9 kg). However, she continued to take care of her physical appearance and did not outwardly speak of feeling guilty or unworthy.

Horder prescribed her an anti-depressant, a monoamine oxidase inhibitor, a few days before her suicide. Knowing she was at risk alone with two young children, he says he visited her daily and made strenuous efforts to have her admitted to a hospital; when that failed, he arranged for a live-in nurse. Commentators have argued that because anti-depressants may take up to three weeks to take effect, her prescription from Horder would not have taken full effect.

The nurse was due to arrive at nine on the morning of February 11, 1963, to help Plath with the care of her children. Upon arrival, she could not get into the flat but eventually gained access with the help of a workman, Charles Langridge. They found Plath dead with her head in the oven, having sealed the rooms between her and her sleeping children with tape, towels and cloths. She was 30years old.

Plath's intentions have been debated. That morning, she asked her downstairs neighbor, Trevor Thomas (1907–1993), what time he would be leaving. She also left a note reading "Call Dr.Horder", including the doctor's phone number. It is argued Plath turned on the gas at a time when Thomas would have been able to see the note (although the escaping gas had seeped downstairs and also rendered Thomas unconscious while he slept). However, in her biography Giving Up: The Last Days of Sylvia Plath, Plath's friend, Jillian Becker, wrote, "According to Mr.Goodchild, a police officer attached to the coroner's office, [Plath] had thrust her head far into the gas oven and had really meant to die." Horder also believed her intention was clear. He stated that "No one who saw the care with which the kitchen was prepared could have interpreted her action as anything but an irrational compulsion." Plath had described the quality of her despair as "owl's talons clenching my heart". In his 1971 book on suicide, friend and critic Al Alvarez claimed that Plath's suicide was an unanswered cry for help, and spoke, in a BBC interview in March2000, about his failure to recognize Plath's depression, saying he regretted his inability to offer her emotional support: "I failed her on that level. I was thirtyyears old and stupid. What did I know about chronic clinical depression? She kind of needed someone to take care of her. And that was not something I could do."

Following Plath's death
An inquest was held on February 15 and gave a ruling of suicide as a result of carbon monoxide poisoning. Hughes was devastated; they had been separated for six months. In a letter to an old friend of Plath's from Smith College, he wrote, "That's the end of my life. The rest is posthumous." Plath's gravestone, in Heptonstall's parish churchyard of St Thomas the Apostle bears the inscription that Hughes chose for her: "Even amidst fierce flames the golden lotus can be planted." Biographers attribute the source of the quote to the Hindu text the Bhagavad Gita or to the 16th-century Buddhist novel Journey to the West written by Wu Cheng'en.

Plath's daughter, Frieda Hughes, is a writer and artist. On March 16, 2009, Nicholas Hughes, Plath's son, hanged himself at his home in Fairbanks, Alaska, following a history of depression.

Works

Plath wrote poetry from the age of eight, her first poem appearing in the Boston Traveller. By the time she arrived at Smith College she had written over 50 short stories and been published in a raft of magazines. In fact Plath desired much of her life to write prose and stories, and she felt that poetry was an aside. But, in sum, she was not successful in publishing prose. At Smith she majored in English and won all the major prizes in writing and scholarship. Additionally, she won a summer editor position at the young women's magazine Mademoiselle, and, on her graduation in 1955, she won the Glascock Prize for "Two Lovers and a Beachcomber by the Real Sea". Later, she wrote for the university publication, Varsity.

The Colossus

By the time Heinemann published her first collection, The Colossus and Other Poems in the UK in late 1960, Plath had been short-listed several times in the Yale Younger Poets book competition and had had work printed in Harper's, The Spectator and The Times Literary Supplement. All the poems in The Colossus had already been printed in major US and British journals and she had a contract with The New Yorker. It was, however, her 1965 collection Ariel, published posthumously, on which Plath's reputation essentially rests. "Often, her work is singled out for the intense coupling of its violent or disturbed imagery and its playful use of alliteration and rhyme."

The Colossus received largely positive UK reviews, highlighting Plath's voice as new and strong, individual and American in tone. Peter Dickinson at Punch called the collection "a real find" and "exhilarating to read", full of "clean, easy verse". Bernard Bergonzi at the Manchester Guardian said the book was an "outstanding technical accomplishment" with a "virtuoso quality". From the point of publication she became a presence on the poetry scene. The book went on to be published in America in 1962 to less-glowing reviews. Whilst her craft was generally praised, her writing was viewed as more derivative of other poets.

The Bell Jar

Plath's semi-autobiographical novel—her mother wanted to block publication—was published in 1963 and in the US in 1971. Describing the compilation of the book to her mother, she wrote, "What I've done is to throw together events from my own life, fictionalising to add color—it's a pot boiler really, but I think it will show how isolated a person feels when he is suffering a breakdown... I've tried to picture my world and the people in it as seen through the distorting lens of a bell jar". She described her novel as "an autobiographical apprentice work which I had to write in order to free myself from the past". Plath dated a Yale senior named Dick Norton during her junior year. Norton, upon whom the character of Buddy in The Bell Jar is based, contracted tuberculosis and was treated at the Ray Brook Sanatorium near Saranac Lake. While visiting Norton, Plath broke her leg skiing, an incident that was fictionalized in the novel. Plath also used the novel to highlight the issue of women in the workforce during the 1950s. She strongly believed in women's abilities to be writers and editors, while society forced them to fulfill secretarial roles.

Double Exposure 
In 1963, after The Bell Jar was published, Plath began working on another literary work, titled Double Exposure, which was never published. According to Ted Hughes in 1979, Plath left behind a typescript of "some 130 pages", but in 1995 he spoke of just "sixty, seventy pages". Olwyn Hughes wrote in 2003 that the typescript may have consisted of the first two chapters, and did not exceed sixty pages.

Ariel

The posthumous publication of Ariel in 1965 precipitated Plath's rise to fame. The poems in Ariel mark a departure from her earlier work into a more personal arena of poetry. Robert Lowell's poetry may have played a part in this shift as she cited Lowell's 1959 book Life Studies as a significant influence, in an interview just before her death. The impact of Ariel was dramatic, with its dark and potentially autobiographical descriptions of mental illness in poems such as "Tulips", "Daddy" and "Lady Lazarus". Plath's work is often held within the genre of confessional poetry and the style of her work compared to other contemporaries, such as Lowell and W. D. Snodgrass. Plath's close friend Al Alvarez, who wrote about her extensively, said of her later work: "Plath's case is complicated by the fact that, in her mature work, she deliberately used the details of her everyday life as raw material for her art. A casual visitor or unexpected telephone call, a cut, a bruise, a kitchen bowl, a candlestick—everything became usable, charged with meaning, transformed. Her poems are full of references and images that seem impenetrable at this distance, but which could mostly be explained in footnotes by a scholar with full access to the details of her life." Many of Plath's later poems deal with what one critic calls the "domestic surreal" in which Plath takes everyday elements of life and twists the images, giving them an almost nightmarish quality. Plath's poem "Morning Song" from Ariel is regarded as one of her finest poems on freedom of expression of an artist.

Plath's fellow confessional poet and friend Anne Sexton commented: "Sylvia and I would talk at length about our first suicide, in detail and in depth—between the free potato chips. Suicide is, after all, the opposite of the poem. Sylvia and I often talked opposites. We talked death with burned-up intensity, both of us drawn to it like moths to an electric lightbulb, sucking on it. She told the story of her first suicide in sweet and loving detail, and her description in The Bell Jar is just that same story." The confessional interpretation of Plath's work has led to some dismissing certain aspects of her work as an exposition of sentimentalist melodrama; in 2010, for example, Theodore Dalrymple asserted that Plath had been the "patron saint of self-dramatisation" and of self-pity. Revisionist critics such as Tracy Brain have, however, argued against a tightly autobiographical interpretation of Plath's material.

Other works
In 1971, the volumes Winter Trees and Crossing the Water were published in the UK, including nine previously unseen poems from the original manuscript of Ariel. Writing in New Statesman, fellow poet Peter Porter wrote:

Crossing the Water is full of perfectly realised works. Its most striking impression is of a front-rank artist in the process of discovering her true power. Such is Plath's control that the book possesses a singularity and certainty which should make it as celebrated as The Colossus or Ariel.

The Collected Poems, published in 1981, edited and introduced by Ted Hughes, contained poetry written from 1956 until her death. Plath was posthumously awarded the Pulitzer Prize for Poetry. In 2006 Anna Journey, then a graduate student at Virginia Commonwealth University, discovered a previously unpublished sonnet written by Plath titled "Ennui". The poem, composed during Plath's early years at Smith College, was published in the online journal Blackbird.

Journals and letters
Plath's letters were published in 1975, edited and selected by her mother Aurelia Plath. The collection, Letters Home: Correspondence 1950–1963, came out partly in response to the strong public reaction to the publication of The Bell Jar in America. Plath began keeping a diary from the age of 11 and continued doing so until her suicide. Her adult diaries, starting from her first year at Smith College in 1950, were first published in 1982 as The Journals of Sylvia Plath, edited by Frances McCullough, with Ted Hughes as consulting editor. In 1982, when Smith College acquired Plath's remaining journals, Hughes sealed two of them until February 11, 2013, the 50th anniversary of Plath's death.

During the last years of his life, Hughes began working on a fuller publication of Plath's journals. In 1998, shortly before his death, he unsealed the two journals, and passed the project onto his children by Plath, Frieda and Nicholas, who passed it on to Karen V. Kukil. Kukil finished her editing in December 1999, and in 2000 Anchor Books published The Unabridged Journals of Sylvia Plath. More than half of the new volume contained newly released material; the American author Joyce Carol Oates hailed the publication as a "genuine literary event". Hughes faced criticism for his role in handling the journals: he claims to have destroyed Plath's last journal, which contained entries from the winter of 1962 up to her death. In the foreword of the 1982 version, he writes, "I destroyed [the last of her journals] because I did not want her children to have to read it (in those days I regarded forgetfulness as an essential part of survival)."

Hughes controversies

As Hughes and Plath were legally married at the time of her death, Hughes inherited the Plath estate, including all her written work. He has been condemned repeatedly for burning Plath's last journal, saying he "did not want her children to have to read it". Hughes lost another journal and an unfinished novel, and instructed that a collection of Plath's papers and journals should not be released until 2013. He has been accused of attempting to control the estate for his own ends, although royalties from Plath's poetry were placed into a trust account for their two children, Frieda and Nicholas.

Plath's gravestone has been repeatedly vandalized by those aggrieved that "Hughes" is written on the stone; they have attempted to chisel it off, leaving only the name "Sylvia Plath". When Hughes' mistress Assia Wevill killed herself and their four-year-old daughter Shura in 1969, this practice intensified. After each defacement, Hughes had the damaged stone removed, sometimes leaving the site unmarked during repair. Outraged mourners accused Hughes in the media of dishonouring her name by removing the stone. Wevill's death led to claims that Hughes had been abusive to both Plath and Wevill.

Radical feminist poet Robin Morgan published the poem "Arraignment", in which she openly accused Hughes of the battery and murder of Plath. Her book Monster (1972) "included a piece in which a gang of Plath aficionados are imagined castrating Hughes, stuffing his penis into his mouth and then blowing out his brains". Hughes threatened to sue Morgan. The book was withdrawn by the publisher Random House, although it remained in circulation among feminists. Other feminists threatened to kill Hughes in Plath's name and pursue a conviction for murder. Plath's poem "The Jailor", in which the speaker condemns her husband's brutality, was included in Morgan's 1970 anthology Sisterhood Is Powerful: An Anthology of Writings from the Women's Liberation Movement.

In 1989, with Hughes under public attack, a battle raged in the letters pages of The Guardian and The Independent. In The Guardian on April 20, 1989, Hughes wrote the article "The Place Where Sylvia Plath Should Rest in Peace": "In the years soon after [Plath's] death, when scholars approached me, I tried to take their apparently serious concern for the truth about Sylvia Plath seriously. But I learned my lesson early. ... If I tried too hard to tell them exactly how something happened, in the hope of correcting some fantasy, I was quite likely to be accused of trying to suppress Free Speech. In general, my refusal to have anything to do with the Plath Fantasia has been regarded as an attempt to suppress Free Speech ... The Fantasia about Sylvia Plath is more needed than the facts. Where that leaves respect for the truth of her life (and of mine), or for her memory, or for the literary tradition, I do not know."

Still the subject of speculation and opprobrium in 1998, Hughes published Birthday Letters that year, his own collection of 88 poems about his relationship with Plath. Hughes had published very little about his experience of the marriage and Plath's subsequent suicide, and the book caused a sensation, being taken as his first explicit disclosure, and it topped best seller charts. It was not known at the volume's release that Hughes had terminal cancer and would die later that year. The book went on to win the Forward Poetry Prize, the T. S. Eliot Prize for Poetry, and the Whitbread Poetry Prize. The poems, written after Plath's death, in some cases long after, try to find a reason why Plath took her own life.

In October 2015, the BBC Two documentary Ted Hughes: Stronger Than Death examined Hughes' life and work; it included audio recordings of Plath reciting her own poetry. Their daughter Frieda spoke for the first time about her mother and father.

Themes and legacy

Sylvia Plath's early poems exhibit what became her typical imagery, using personal and nature-based depictions featuring, for example, the moon, blood, hospitals, fetuses, and skulls. They were mostly imitation exercises of poets she admired such as Dylan Thomas, W. B. Yeats and Marianne Moore. Late in 1959, when she and Hughes were at the Yaddo writers' colony in New York State, she wrote the seven-part "Poem for a Birthday", echoing Theodore Roethke's Lost Son sequence, though its theme is her own traumatic breakdown and suicide attempt at 20. After 1960 her work moved into a more surreal landscape darkened by a sense of imprisonment and looming death, overshadowed by her father. The Colossus is shot through with themes of death, redemption and resurrection. After Hughes left, Plath produced, in less than two months, the 40 poems of rage, despair, love, and vengeance on which her reputation mostly rests.

Plath's landscape poetry, which she wrote throughout her life, has been described as "a rich and important area of her work that is often overlooked ... some of the best of which was written about the Yorkshire moors". Her September 1961 poem "Wuthering Heights" takes its title from the Emily Brontë novel, but its content and style is Plath's own particular vision of the Pennine landscape.

It was Plath's publication of Ariel in 1965 that precipitated her rise to fame. As soon as it was published, critics began to see the collection as the charting of Plath's increasing desperation or death wish. Her dramatic death became her most famous aspect, and remains so. Time and Life both reviewed the slim volume of Ariel in the wake of her death. The critic at Time said: "Within a week of her death, intellectual London was hunched over copies of a strange and terrible poem she had written during her last sick slide toward suicide. 'Daddy' was its title; its subject was her morbid love-hatred of her father; its style was as brutal as a truncheon. What is more, 'Daddy' was merely the first jet of flame from a literary dragon who in the last months of her life breathed a burning river of bile across the literary landscape. ... In her most ferocious poems, 'Daddy' and 'Lady Lazarus', fear, hate, love, death and the poet's own identity become fused at black heat with the figure of her father, and through him, with the guilt of the German exterminators and the suffering of their Jewish victims. They are poems, as Robert Lowell says in his preface to Ariel, that 'play Russian roulette with six cartridges in the cylinder'."

Some in the feminist movement saw Plath as speaking for their experience, as a "symbol of blighted female genius". Writer Honor Moore describes Ariel as marking the beginning of a movement, Plath suddenly visible as "a woman on paper", certain and audacious. Moore says: "When Sylvia Plath's Ariel was published in the United States in 1966, American women noticed. Not only women who ordinarily read poems, but housewives and mothers whose ambitions had awakened ... Here was a woman, superbly trained in her craft, whose final poems uncompromisingly charted female rage, ambivalence, and grief, in a voice with which many women identified." Some feminists threatened to kill Hughes in Plath's name.

Smith College, Plath's alma mater, holds her literary papers in the Smith College Library.

The United States Postal Service introduced a postage stamp featuring Plath in 2012. An English Heritage plaque records Plath's residence at 3 Chalcot Square, in London.

In 2018, The New York Times published an obituary for Plath as part of the Overlooked history project.

Portrayals in media
Plath's voice is heard in a BBC documentary about her life, recorded in London in late 1962. Of the BBC recording Elizabeth Hardwick wrote:
I have never before learned anything from a poetic reading, unless the clothes, the beard, the girls, the poor or good condition of the poet can be considered a kind of knowledge. But I was taken aback by Sylvia Plath’s reading. It was not anything like I could have imagined. Not a trace of the modest, retreating, humorous Worcester, Massachusetts, of Elizabeth Bishop; nothing of the swallowed plain Pennsylvania of Marianne Moore. Instead these bitter poems—"Daddy", "Lady Lazarus", "The Applicant", "Fever 103°"—were beautifully read, projected in full-throated, plump, diction-perfect, Englishy, mesmerizing cadences, all round and rapid, and paced and spaced. Poor recessive Massachusetts had been erased. "I have done it again!" Clearly, perfectly, staring you down. She seemed to be standing at a banquet like Timon, crying, "Uncover, dogs, and lap!"

Gwyneth Paltrow portrayed Plath in the biopic Sylvia (2003). Despite criticism from Elizabeth Sigmund, a friend of Plath and Hughes, that Plath was portrayed as a "permanent depressive and possessive person", she conceded that "the film has an atmosphere towards the end of her life which is heartbreaking in its accuracy". Frieda Hughes, now a poet and painter, who was two years old when her mother died, was angered by the making of entertainment featuring her parents' lives. She accused the "peanut crunching" public of wanting to be titillated by the family's tragedies. In 2003, Frieda reacted to the situation in the poem "My Mother" in Tatler:
Now they want to make a film
For anyone lacking the ability
To imagine the body, head in oven,
Orphaning children

 ... they think
I should give them my mother's words
To fill the mouth of their monster,
Their Sylvia Suicide Doll

Publication list

Poetry collections
 The Colossus and Other Poems (1960, William Heinemann)
 Ariel (1965, Faber and Faber)
 Three Women: A Monologue for Three Voices (1968, Turret Books)
 Crossing the Water (1971, Faber and Faber)
 Winter Trees (1971, Faber and Faber)
 The Collected Poems (1981, Faber and Faber)
 Selected Poems (1985, Faber and Faber)
 Ariel: The Restored Edition (2004, Faber and Faber)

Collected prose and novels
 The Bell Jar, under the pseudonym "Victoria Lucas" (novel, 1963, Heinemann)
 Letters Home: Correspondence 1950–1963 (1975, Harper & Row, US; Faber and Faber, UK)
 Johnny Panic and the Bible of Dreams: Short Stories, Prose, and Diary Excerpts (1977, Faber and Faber)
 The Journals of Sylvia Plath (1982, Dial Press)
 The Magic Mirror (1989), Plath's Smith College senior thesis
 The Unabridged Journals of Sylvia Plath, edited by Karen V. Kukil (2000, Anchor Books) 
 The Letters of Sylvia Plath, Volume 1, edited by Peter K. Steinberg and Karen V. Kukil (2017, Faber and Faber)
 The Letters of Sylvia Plath, Volume 2, edited by Peter K. Steinberg and Karen V. Kukil (2018, Faber and Faber)
 Mary Ventura and the Ninth Kingdom (2019, Faber and Faber)

Children's books
 The Bed Book, illustrated by Quentin Blake (1976, Faber and Faber)
 The It-Doesn't-Matter Suit (1996, Faber and Faber)
 Mrs. Cherry's Kitchen (2001, Faber and Faber)
 Collected Children's Stories (UK, 2001, Faber and Faber)

See also

 Sylvia Plath effect

References

Notes

Citations

Sources

Further reading

 Axelrod, Steven Gould. (1992). Sylvia Plath: The Wound and the Cure of Words. Baltimore, Maryland: Johns Hopkins University. .
 

 
 Hayman, Ronald. (1991). The Death and Life of Sylvia Plath. Secaucus, New Jersey: Carol Publishing. .
 Hemphill, Stephanie. (2007). Your Own, Sylvia: A Verse Portrait of Sylvia Plath. New York: Alfred A. Knopf. .
 Kyle, Barry. (1976). Sylvia Plath: A Dramatic Portrait; Conceived and Adapted from Her Writings. London: Faber and Faber. .
 Malcolm, Janet. (1995). The Silent Woman: Sylvia Plath and Ted Hughes. New York: Vintage. .
 
 Middlebrook, Diane. (2003). Her Husband: Hughes and Plath – a Marriage. New York: Viking. 
 
 
 
 Steinberg, Peter K. (2004). Sylvia Plath. Philadelphia, Pennsylvania: Chelsea House. .
 Tabor, Stephen. (1988). Sylvia Plath: An Analytical Bibliography. London: Mansell. .
 
 
 Wagner, Erica. (2002). Ariel's Gift: Ted Hughes, Sylvia Plath, and the Story of Birthday Letters. New York: W. W. Norton. .
 Wagner-Martin, Linda. (2003). Sylvia Plath: A Literary Life. Basingstoke, Hampshire: Palgrave Macmillan. .

External links

 
 Peter K. Steinberg's A celebration, this is
 Plath profile from American Academy of Poets
 Sylvia Plath drawings at The Mayor Gallery The Daily Telegraph
 
 Sylvia Plath at the British Library
 Ted Hughes and Sylvia Plath collection at University of Victoria, Special Collections
 Sylvia Plath collection, 1952–1989, Stuart A. Rose Manuscript, Archives, and Rare Book Library, Emory University Libraries
 Harriet Rosenstein research files on Sylvia Plath, 1910–2018, Stuart A. Rose Manuscript, Archives, and Rare Book Library, Emory University Libraries
Sylvia Plath Collection at the Mortimer Rare Book Collection, Smith College Special Collections
 
 
 BBC profile and video. BBC archive. Plath reading "Lady Lazarus" from Ariel (sound file) 

 
1932 births
1963 suicides
20th-century American novelists
20th-century American poets
20th-century American women writers
20th-century American short story writers
20th-century essayists
Alumni of Newnham College, Cambridge
American child writers
American diarists
American essayists
American expatriates in England
American people of Austrian descent
American people of German descent
American Unitarians
American women essayists
American women novelists
American women poets
American women short story writers
Burials in West Yorkshire
Female suicides
Glascock Prize winners
McLean Hospital patients
Novelists from Massachusetts
People from Jamaica Plain
People from Winthrop, Massachusetts
People with mood disorders
Poets from Massachusetts
Pseudonymous women writers
Pulitzer Prize for Poetry winners
Smith College alumni
Suicides by carbon monoxide poisoning
Suicides by gas
Suicides in Hampstead
Wellesley High School alumni
Women diarists
Writers from Boston
Ted Hughes
20th-century pseudonymous writers
20th-century diarists
Yaddo alumni
Fulbright alumni
Women who experienced pregnancy loss